Calum Penrose is a New Zealand politician who was Mayor of Papakura from 2007 to 2010, and an Auckland Councillor from 2010 to 2016.

Political career

In 2007 Penrose was elected the Mayor of Papakura, defeating incumbent John Robertson.

In the 2010 Auckland Council elections Penrose won a seat in the Manurewa-Papakura ward standing under the Manurewa-Papakura First Action ticket. He was re-elected in 2013. He stood in the 2016 election but failed to be re-elected.

References

External links
Papakura First website

Living people
Auckland Councillors
Mayors of Papakura
Year of birth missing (living people)